Shikongo Iipinge Senior Secondary School is a school in Tsandi in the Omusati Region in Namibia.  it has 442 students and 20 teachers. It was founded by Chris Iipinge, circuit inspector and first principal of the school, in 1985.

See also
 List of schools in Namibia
 Education in Namibia

References

Schools in Omusati Region